Kotma Assembly constituency is one of the 230 Legislative Assembly constituencies of Madhya Pradesh state in central India.

It is in Anuppur district.

Members of the Legislative Assembly

Election results

2013

See also
Kotma

References

Assembly constituencies of Madhya Pradesh
Anuppur district